Rui Suleimane Camara Dabó (born 5 October 1994) is a footballer who plays for U.D. Oliveirense as a goalkeeper. Born in Portugal, he represents Guinea-Bissau at international level.

Career
Born in Setúbal, Dabó has played club football for Caldas, Pinhalnovense, Cova da Piedade, Olímpico Montijo, LGC Moncarapachense, CF Armacenenses, Fabril Barreiro, Fátima, Comércio e Indústria and U.D. Oliveirense.

He made his international debut for Guinea-Bissau in 2017.

References

External links
Rui Dabó at ZeroZero

1994 births
Living people
Sportspeople from Setúbal
Portuguese people of Bissau-Guinean descent
Portuguese footballers
Citizens of Guinea-Bissau through descent
Bissau-Guinean footballers
Guinea-Bissau international footballers
Caldas S.C. players
C.D. Pinhalnovense players
C.D. Cova da Piedade players
Clube Olímpico do Montijo players
C.F. Os Armacenenses players
G.D. Fabril players
C.D. Fátima players
U.D. Oliveirense players
Campeonato de Portugal (league) players
Association football goalkeepers
2017 Africa Cup of Nations players
2019 Africa Cup of Nations players